-i may be:
 An English suffix used to create demonyms (see Demonyms#Suffixation.)
 A suffix in Hebrew.
 An Arabic suffix used to form a nisba (see Arabic grammar#nisba.)
 A negative imaginary unit